Russell E. Lee (born January 27, 1950) is a former American basketball player in the National Basketball Association (NBA). He was selected as the 6th overall pick in the 1972 NBA draft by the Milwaukee Bucks. He played college basketball for the Marshall Thundering Herd.

Collegiate career
Lee played four seasons with the Marshall University Thundering Herd, with whom he averaged 23.9 points and 11.3 rebounds per game. In 1985, he was inducted into the Marshall Hall of Fame, and in 2003 he had his number retired.

Professional career
Lee was drafted sixth overall in the 1972 NBA Draft by the Milwaukee Bucks, with whom he played two seasons averaging 2.6 points per game coming off the bench. His best season for the Bucks was his rookie season, when he averaged 2.8 points per game.

Before the start of the 1974-1975 NBA season, Lee was traded to the New Orleans Jazz with a 1975 NBA Draft first round pick for Steve Kuberski and a second round pick in 1975. Lee would play only 15 games for the Jazz, averaging 4.3 points and 2.1 rebounds per game before being cut and opting to retire.

NBA career statistics

Regular season
{| class="wikitable sortable" style="font-size:95%; text-align:right;"
!Year
!Team
!GP
!MPG
!FG%
!FT%
!RPG
!APG
!SPG
!BPG
!PPG
|-
| style="text-align:left;"| 
| style="text-align:left;"| Milwaukee
| 46 || 6.0 || .386 || .744 || .9 || .8 || – || – || 2.8
|-
| style="text-align:left;"| 
| style="text-align:left;"| Milwaukee
| 36 || 4.6 || .404 || .688 || 1.1 || .6 || .3 || .0 || 2.4
|-
| style="text-align:left;"| 
| style="text-align:left;"| New Orleans
| 15 || 9.3 || .382 || .500 || 2.1 || .5 || .7 || .2 || 4.3
|- class="sortbottom"
| style="text-align:center;" colspan="2" | Career
| 97 || 6.0 || .391 || .685 || 1.2 || .7 || .4 || .1 || 2.9

Playoffs
{| class="wikitable sortable" style="font-size:95%; text-align:right;"
!Year
!Team
!GP
!MPG
!FG%
!FT%
!RPG
!APG
!SPG
!BPG
!PPG
|-
| style="text-align:left;"| 1973
| style="text-align:left;"| Milwaukee
| 5 || 2.6 || .571 || – || .8 || .4 || – || – || 3.2
|-
| style="text-align:left;"| 1974
| style="text-align:left;"| Milwaukee
| 6 || 2.0 || .625 || .250 || .5 || .2 || .5 || .2 || 1.8
|- class="sortbottom"
| style="text-align:center;" colspan="2" | Career
| 11 || 2.3 || .591 || .250 || .6 || .3 || .5 || .2 || 2.5

Personal life
Lee is the older brother of Ron Lee, former All-American basketball player at the University of Oregon and 1978 NBA steals leader. Lee has a brother who played basketball at Marshall as well named, Eugene.

References

1950 births
Living people
African-American basketball players
American men's basketball players
Basketball players from Boston
Hyde Park High School (Massachusetts) alumni
Marshall Thundering Herd men's basketball players
Milwaukee Bucks draft picks
Milwaukee Bucks players
New Orleans Jazz players
Shooting guards
Small forwards
21st-century African-American people
20th-century African-American sportspeople